Bakary Bouba Saré (born 5 April 1990) is a Burkinabé professional footballer who plays as a midfielder.

Career

Anderlecht
Saré made his debut in the Belgian Pro League for R.S.C. Anderlecht in a match against R.A.E.C. Mons on 22 December 2007, when he came from bench.

He played 26 league matches, 10 UEFA Europa League matches and 2 UEFA Champions League matches for the Belgian giants.

Rosenborg
Bakary Saré joined Rosenborg BK on 31 August 2010 with a one-year loan contract, playing only 3 league matches but scoring 4 presences in UEFA Europa League.

After a short spell he returned to Belgium to play nine more matches for R.S.C. Anderlecht in the first part of the 2010/2011 season.

CFR Cluj
On 23 February 2011, he signed a three and a half years contract with the Romanian Liga I club CFR Cluj for an undisclosed fee.

Dinamo Zagreb
In July 2013, Bouba was transferred to Dinamo Zagreb. Despite news in Romanian media saying he was transferred for €500k, he joined the club on a half-year loan with an option to buy.

Al Ain
On 20 January 2014, he joined UAE Arabian Gulf League side Al Ain on a six-month loan deal, In July he returned to CFR Cluj.

International career
Saré was born in Abidjan, Ivory Coast, but is of Burkinabé descent. He played for the Ivory Coast U20s in their winning campaign for the 2010 Toulon Tournament, playing every match and against France.

He was called up to the Burkina Faso national football team for a pair of 2017 Africa Cup of Nations qualification matches in March 2016. He made his debut in a 1–0 victory against Uganda.

Honours

Anderlecht
 Belgian Cup: 2007–08
 Belgian Pro League: 2009–10
 Belgian Super Cup: 2010

Rosenborg
 Norwegian Premier League: 2010

CFR Cluj
 Romanian Liga I: 2011–12

Dinamo Zagreb
Croatian League: 2013–14

Moreirense
Taça da Liga: 2016–17

Burkina Faso
Africa Cup of Nations bronze: 2017

References

External links
 
 
 
 
 
 

1990 births
Living people
Footballers from Abidjan
Citizens of Burkina Faso through descent
Burkinabé footballers
Burkina Faso international footballers
Ivorian footballers
Ivory Coast under-20 international footballers
Association football midfielders
Belgian Pro League players
Eliteserien players
Liga I players
Croatian Football League players
Primeira Liga players
R.S.C. Anderlecht players
Rosenborg BK players
CFR Cluj players
GNK Dinamo Zagreb players
Al Ain FC players
Vitória S.C. players
Moreirense F.C. players
C.F. Os Belenenses players
Expatriate footballers in Norway
Expatriate footballers in Romania
Expatriate footballers in Croatia
Expatriate footballers in the United Arab Emirates
Expatriate footballers in Portugal
Burkinabé expatriate sportspeople in Romania
Burkinabé expatriate sportspeople in Norway
Burkinabé expatriate sportspeople in Croatia
Burkinabé expatriate sportspeople in the United Arab Emirates
Burkinabé expatriate sportspeople in Portugal
Ivorian expatriate sportspeople in Romania
Ivorian expatriate sportspeople in Norway
Ivorian expatriate sportspeople in Croatia
Ivorian expatriate sportspeople in the United Arab Emirates
Ivorian expatriate sportspeople in Portugal
Burkinabé people of Ivorian descent
Ivorian people of Burkinabé descent
Sportspeople of Burkinabé descent
2017 Africa Cup of Nations players
21st-century Burkinabé people